A wishing well is a term from European folklore to describe wells where it was thought that any spoken wish would be granted. The idea that a wish would be granted came from the notion that water housed deities or had been placed there as a gift from the gods. This practice is thought to have arisen because water is a source of life, and was often a scarce commodity.

History

Germanic and Celtic traditions 
The Germanic and Celtic peoples considered springs and wells sacred places. Sometimes the places were marked with wooden statues possibly of the god associated with the pool. Germanic peoples were known to throw the armour and weapons of defeated enemies into bogs and other pools of water as offerings to their gods.
Water was seen to have healing powers, and wells became popular, with many people drinking the water, bathing in it, or simply wishing over it. Some people believed that the guardians or dwellers of the well would grant them their wish if they paid a price. After uttering the wish, one would generally drop coins in the well.  That wish would then be granted by the guardian or dweller, based upon how the coin would land at the bottom of the well. If the coin landed heads up, the guardian of the well would grant the wish, but the wish of a tails up coin would be ignored. It was thus potentially lucky to throw coins in the well, but it depended on how they landed.

The Celtic Clootie Well tradition and the English well dressing tradition appear to be related to this kind of ancient well veneration.

The tradition of dropping pennies in ponds and fountains stems from this. Coins would be placed there as gifts for the deity to show appreciation.

Nordic myths 
This may be a leftover from ancient mythology such as Mímir's Well from Nordic myths, also known as the "Well of Wisdom", a well that could grant you infinite wisdom provided you sacrificed something you held dear. Odin  was asked to sacrifice his right eye which he threw into the well to receive not only the wisdom of seeing the future but the understanding of why things must be. Mímir is the Nordic god of wisdom, and his well sits at the roots of Yggdrasil, the World Tree which draws its water from the well.

Oligodynamic effect 
Another theory is that people may have unknowingly discovered the biocidal properties of both copper and silver; the two metals traditionally used in coins. Throwing coins made of either of these metals could help make the water safer to drink. Wells that were frequented by those that threw coins in may have been less affected by a range of bacterial infections making them seem more fortunate and may have even appeared to have cured people suffering from repeated infections.

Extent 
In November 2006 the "Fountain Money Mountain" reported that tourists throw just under 3 million pounds sterling per year into wishing wells.

References

External links 

Wishing Wells And Superstitions

Water wells
Garden ornaments
European folklore
American folklore
English folklore
Superstitions
Articles containing video clips